Basiluzzo is an islet (barely ), and the smallest of eight islands in the Aeolian Islands, a volcanic island chain north of Sicily. In antiquity, the island was named "Hycesia".

Media 
It is featured in the Italian film L'avventura, where the characters are on a motor boat looking for somewhere to swim. They sail up to Basiluzzo but decide to travel to Lisca Bianca, another of the Aeolian Islands nearest to Basiluzzo.

References

Aeolian Islands